Osmia latreillei is a species of mason bee belonging to the family Megachilidae subfamily Megachilinae.

Subspecies
Subspecies include:
  Osmia latreillei iberoafricana Peters, 1975
  Osmia latreillei latreillei  (Spinola, 1806)

Distribution
This species is mainly found in central and southern Europe (France, Germany, Switzerland, Italy, Greece, and Spain). Occasionally these bees have also been found in North Africa and in the Middle East.

Biology
Females of this species dig tunnels in the ground. At the end of each tunnel the bees hollow out cells where they lay supplies of pollen and deposit eggs. After hatching, the larvae feed directly on pollen grains for about thirty days. The bees overwinter in the stage of prepupae. In the spring they enter the pupal stage, while the adults appear at the end of March. The flying season lasts from April through July.

The bees are oligolectic, gathering pollen only from Asteraceae species. However, adults have been observed feeding on flowers of various families of plants, mainly Reichardia picroides (Asteraceae), Echium angustifolium (Boraginaceae), Vicia villosa (Leguminosae), Euphorbia spp. (Euphorbiaceae), Salvia verticillata (Labiatae), Rosmarinus officinalis (Labiatae) and Morina persica (Dipsacaceae).

References

External links
 Biolib

latreillei
Insects described in 1806
Hymenoptera of Europe